Franklin Park is a village in Cook County, Illinois, United States. The population was 18,467 at the 2020 census, up from 18,333 at the 2010 census. It was named for real estate broker Lesser Franklin who bought acres of the area when it was a majority of farming fields.

Geography

Demographics
As of the 2020 census there were 18,467 people, 5,747 households, and 4,165 families residing in the village. The racial makeup of the village was 48.15% White, 1.68% African American, 2.04% Native American, 3.95% Asian, 0.03% Pacific Islander, 26.00% from other races, and 18.15% from two or more races. Hispanic or Latino of any race were 52.16% of the population.

There were 5,747 households, out of which 58.15% had children under the age of 18 living with them, 47.82% were married couples living together, 19.89% had a female householder with no husband present, and 27.53% were non-families. 23.98% of all households were made up of individuals, and 8.00% had someone living alone who was 65 years of age or older. The average household size was 3.67 and the average family size was 3.09.

The village's age distribution consisted of 22.0% under the age of 18, 9.6% from 18 to 24, 29.2% from 25 to 44, 27% from 45 to 64, and 12.1% who were 65 years of age or older. The median age was 37.3 years. For every 100 females, there were 95.5 males. For every 100 females age 18 and over, there were 89.8 males.

The median income for a household in the village was $67,755, and the median income for a family was $82,361. Males had a median income of $44,973 versus $30,943 for females. The per capita income for the village was $26,547. About 11.7% of families and 12.5% of the population were below the poverty line, including 21.3% of those under age 18 and 9.7% of those age 65 or over.

Transportation 

Franklin Park has three Metra stations: Belmont Avenue on Metra's North Central Service, which provides daily rail service between Antioch, Illinois and Chicago, Illinois (at Union Station); Franklin Park and Mannheim on the Milwaukee District/West Line which connects Chicago to Elgin, Illinois.
Franklin Park is in the close proximity of O'Hare International Airport; airplanes can be seen taking off and descending over the village. The village is served by three railroads: Canadian Pacific Railway (formerly Milwaukee Road), Canadian National Railway (formerly Wisconsin Central), and the Indiana Harbor Belt Railroad.

Businesses

Franklin Park is home to Grand Stand Pizza, in 2005 voted Best Thin Crust in Chicago by Fox News Chicago, A.M. Castle & Co, R&M Trucking Co.
Aerospace Manufacturer, Chucking Machine Products, Sax-Tiedemann Funeral Home & Crematorium, Precision Steel Warehouse, Inc., and Ex-Cell Kaiser, manufacturers of waste and recycling products.

It was also home to Midway Manufacturing before the company relocated in 1991.

Education
Elementary school districts:
 Franklin Park School District 84
 Hester Junior High School
 North Elementary School
 Passow Elementary School
 Pietrini Elementary School
 East Early Childhood Center
 Mannheim School District 83
 Enger School, for disabled children, in Franklin Park
 Scott Elementary School
 Westdale Elementary School
 Roy Elementary School
 Mannheim Middle School
 Schiller Park School District 81 includes a portion of Franklin Park.

High school districts:
 Leyden High School District 212
East Leyden High School
West Leyden High School

Private Catholic schools in nearby River Grove (of the Roman Catholic Archdiocese of Chicago):
 St. Cyprian Catholic Elementary School
 Guerin College Preparatory High School - Guerin will close permanently after Spring 2020.

Triton College is the area community college.

Notable people

 Leo Bartoline, Illinois legislator and lawyer
 Ned Colletti, baseball executive
 Glen Grunwald, only four-time high school All-State basketball player in Illinois history; former GM of Toronto Raptors and New York Knicks  
 Mike Shanahan, head coach for the NFL's Los Angeles Raiders, Super Bowl champion Denver Broncos, and Washington Redskins

References

External links

Village of Franklin Park official website
Franklin Park Public Library

 
Populated places established in 1892
Villages in Illinois
Chicago metropolitan area
Villages in Cook County, Illinois
1892 establishments in Illinois